The Naga Hills Regional Progressive Party (NHRPP) was a political party in Myanmar.

History
Following the reintroduction of multi-party democracy after the 8888 Uprising, the party contested six seats in the 1990 general elections. It received 0.08% of the vote, winning two seats; U Khapo Kailon in Lahe and U Dwe Pawt in Leshi.

The party was abolished by the military government on 18 March 1992.

References

Defunct political parties in Myanmar
1992 disestablishments in Myanmar
Political parties disestablished in 1992